Foam glass is a  porous glass foam material. Its advantages as a building material include its light weight, high strength, and thermal and acoustic insulating properties. It is made by heating a mixture of crushed or granulated glass and a blowing agent (chemical foaming agent) such as carbon or limestone. Near the melting point of the glass, the blowing agent releases a gas, producing a foaming effect in the glass. After cooling the mixture hardens into a rigid material with gas-filled closed-cell pores comprising a large portion of its volume.

As to chemical foaming agents, there are several additives that facilitate the release of the gaseous phase upon heat treatment. In general, these additives are categorized into two categories: a) redox and neutralization agents, and b) decomposing agents. Redox and neutralization agents include nonoxide materials, e.g. carbides or nitrides. Decomposing agents include sulfates, e.g. CaSO4•nH2O, organic compounds, and carbonates, e.g. CaCO3. These materials release gas following decomposition and/or burning.

History
In the 1930s, Saint-Gobain of France first developed foam glass with calcium carbonate as a foaming agent. In 1935, it applied for a patent. 

An early report of foam glass as a construction material was made by the Soviet scientist, Professor I.I.Kitaygorodskiy at the All-Union Conference on Standardization and Manufacture of New Construction Materials in Moscow in 1932. Subsequently, in 1939, the Soviet Union reports experimentally produced foam glass at the intermediate pilot plant of the Mendeleev Institute of Chemical Technology. A glass powder screened through a 0.09 mm mesh was mixed with limestone and later on with anthracite and coal as gasifier.

The product that is known today as Foamglas cellular glass insulation, was developed by Pittsburgh Corning and was later acquired by Owens Corning. It is made of cullet, foaming agent, modified additive and foaming accelerator. After fine pulverization and uniform mixing, it is melted at high temperature, foamed and annealed. An inorganic non-metallic glass material, it consists of a large number of uniform bubble structures with a diameter of 1 to 2 mm. Sound-absorbing Foamglas insulation is more than 50% open cell bubbles, and heat-insulating Foamglas is more than 75% closed-cell air bubbles, which can be adjusted according to the requirements of use through changes in production technical parameters. Similar products by other manufacturers are sold as 'cellular glass' or 'foam glass'.

Properties 
Because this material is moisture-proof, fireproof, and anti-corrosive, and the glass material has the advantages of long-term use performance, it is favored for uses in harsh environments such as in heat insulation, deep cooling, underground, open-air, flammable, damp, and under chemical attack. It is widely used in wall insulation, petroleum, chemical industry, machine room noise reduction, highway sound absorption barrier, electric power, military products, etc. and is called green environmental protection insulation material by users.

Depending on the properties of the foam glass, it can be used as insulation material in various sectors of construction engineering, as well as in shipbuilding, chemical, cryogenic, and high-temperature technologies. White and stained glass are also used as sound absorbing and decorative materials. Waste in production – foamed glass powder and scrap can also be used as fillers for decorative light concrete and other applications. Depending on the application, foam glass products produced by the corresponding processes can be divided into four categories, namely insulating foam glass, sound-absorbing decorative foam glass, facing foam glass, and granular foam glass.

Foam glass is a kind of lightweight, high-strength building material and decorative material with excellent performance (insulation) and sound absorption that is both moisture-proof and fireproof.  The temperature range is from -196 degrees to 450 degrees Celsius.  Although other new insulation materials emerge in an endless stream, foam glass occupies an increasingly important position in the fields of low thermal insulation, moisture-proof engineering, and sound absorption due to its permanence, safety, and high reliability.  Its production is the recycling of waste solid materials, which is an example of protecting the environment and obtaining substantial economic benefits. Recently, it is available in monolitic dimensions of 2.8 x 1.2m. 

Generally used as insulation materials and wall materials for construction and industrial equipment.

Application 
Foam glass is fireproof, waterproof, non-toxic, corrosion-resistant, anti-mite, non-aging, non-radioactive, and insulating. Anti-magnetic wave, anti-static, high mechanical strength, with good adhesion to various types of mud. It is a stable building exterior wall and roof insulation, sound insulation, and waterproof material.

According to reports, foam glass can be used in places that require sound insulation and heat insulation, leak prevention and flood control.  It has functions for home cleaning and health care.  The use of foam glass to protect the heating duct reduces heat loss by approximately 25% compared to conventional protective materials.

Foam glass, also known as porous glass, is filled with numerous open or closed small pores. The area of the pores is 80%~90% of the total volume, and the pore size is 0.5~5mm, and some are as small as a few microns.

1. The matrix of the foam glass is glass, so it does not absorb water. The internal bubbles are also closed, so there is no capillary phenomenon and no penetration, so foam glass is currently the most ideal thermal insulation material. 

2. The mechanical strength is high, and the intensity change is proportional to the apparent density. It has excellent pressure resistance and can withstand the erosion and load of the external environment more than other materials. The combination of excellent compression resistance and moisture barrier properties makes foam glass an ideal thermal insulation material for underground pipelines and tank foundations. 

3. Foam glass has good thermal and moisture permeability, so thermal conductivity is stable for a long time, and it does not change due to environmental influences, and the thermal insulation performance is good.

4. Foam glass is a matrix wet glass, so it will not burn spontaneously and will not be burned. It is an excellent fireproof material. Foam glass has an operating temperature range of -200 to 430 °C, a small expansion coefficient (8 × 10 °C) and is reversible, so the material properties are unchanged for a long time, are not easy to embrittle, and have good stability.

5. Foam glass has good sound insulation performance and strong absorption of sound waves. The average penetration loss is 28.3 dB in 60~400 Hz.

6. The dyeing property of foam glass is good, so it can be used as insulation decoration materials.

Foam glass insulation aggregate is used in the same way as coated clay aggregate but is capable of being used as a load-bearing hardcore. It also offers better insulation (lambda/k value = 0.08 – approximately 20% lower thermal conductivity than lightweight expanded clay aggregate). It therefore needs less depth for similar thermal performance.

See also 
Nanofoam
Metal foam
Ceramic foam
Porous medium
Reticulated foam
Foam glass gravel

References

External links 

 
 
 Foam glass -Britannica online
 

Building materials
Building insulation materials